Călin  is a Romanian masculine given name and surname of probable Slavic origin meaning guelder rose. It is similar to the Ukrainian and Russian Kalyna. But it may be related to the Greek name Kalinikos meaning fair or beautiful victor. It may refer to:

 Călin Alupi (1906–1988), Romanian painter
 Călin Dan (born 1955), Romanian artist, theorist and curator
 Călin Matei (born 1966), Romanian politician
 Călin Moldovan (born 1981), Romanian football player
 Călin Popescu-Tăriceanu (born 1952), Romanian politician
 Călin Peter Netzer (born 1975), German-Romanian film director
 Cristian Călin Panin (born 1978), Romanian football player
 Ottoi Călin (1886–1917), Romanian physician, journalist and socialist militant of Jewish descent

See also
 Călinescu (surname)
 Călinești (disambiguation)
 Călinești River (disambiguation)
 Călina (given name), a Romanian given name
 Calinic (given name), a Romanian given name

Romanian masculine given names